The 1999 European Junior Canoe Slalom Championships  were the 3rd edition of the European Junior Canoe Slalom Championships. The event took place in Solkan, Slovenia from 17 to 18 July 1999 under the auspices of the European Canoe Association (ECA). A total of 8 medal events took place.

Medal summary

Men

Canoe

Kayak

Women

Kayak

Medal table

References

External links
European Canoe Association

European Junior and U23 Canoe Slalom Championships
European Junior and U23 Canoe Slalom Championships